Wasplike is the fifth EP by JK Flesh, a moniker of English musician Justin Broadrick, and was released on 15 June 2018. It was his first release on Manchester techno label Inner Surface Music. The EP was inspired by the drum and bass works of Dillinja, amongst others.

Release and reception
Wasplike was released on 15 June 2018 as a limited 12-inch EP.

Resident Advisor gave the EP a rating of 3.7/5 and called it "one track shy of brutal perfection", saying that when compared to one of Broadrick's previous EPs, 2017's Exit Stance, Wasplike is "even colder and more smothering, dialling up the tension between paranoia and pleasure, weariness and euphoria."

Track listing

Personnel
Credits adapted from Wasplike liner notes

JK Flesh
 Justin Broadrick – instruments, production

Technical personnel
 Ajna Design – artwork
 Lewis Hopkin – mastering

References

Justin Broadrick albums
Albums produced by Justin Broadrick
2018 EPs